The 2011 Canadian Senior Curling Championships were held from March 19 to 26 at the Digby Arena and Digby Curling Club in Digby, Nova Scotia. The winning teams represented Canada at the 2012 World Senior Curling Championships in Tårnby, Denmark.

Men's

Teams

Standings

Results

Draw 1

Draw 2

Draw 3

Draw 4

Draw 5

Draw 6

Draw 7

Draw 8

Draw 9

Draw 10

Draw 11

Draw 12

Draw 13

Draw 14

Draw 15

Draw 16

Playoffs

Tiebreaker

Semifinal

Final

Women's

Teams

Standings

Results

Draw 1

Draw 2

Draw 3

Draw 4

Draw 5

Draw 6

Draw 7

Draw 8

Draw 9

Draw 10

Draw 11

Draw 12

Draw 13

Draw 14

Draw 15

Draw 16

Playoffs

Semifinal

Final

External links
Canadian Seniors Home Page

2011
Senior Curling Championships
Digby County, Nova Scotia
Curling competitions in Nova Scotia
2011 in Nova Scotia